Simon Skjodt Assembly Hall, formerly named and still commonly referred to as simply Assembly Hall, is a 17,222-seat arena on the campus of Indiana University in Bloomington, Indiana. It is the home of the Indiana Hoosiers men's basketball and women's basketball teams. It opened in 1971, replacing the "New" IU Fieldhouse.  The court is named after Branch McCracken, the men's basketball coach who led the school to its first two NCAA National Championships in 1940 and 1953.

History

Construction
Indiana officials spent decades planning and four years of construction before The Assembly Hall was finally opened in 1971 at a cost of $26.6 million. The new "Assembly Hall" was named in honor of the school's first basketball arena of the same name. The facility was intended to be aesthetically pleasing and hold a large capacity while offering modern conveniences.

The opening of the arena coincided with the debut of coach Bob Knight, who guided the Hoosiers for 29 seasons before his dismissal by then-IU president Myles Brand in September 2000.

School officials were intent on having the majority of the seats on the sides in order to improve the viewing experience, with only a small number (20 rows of bleachers) behind the baskets. Thus, in order to fit over 17,000 seats in the arena the sides needed to be very steep. The facility also features two balconies, but they are so high up that sitting in them can feel quite far away from the court.

The Assembly Hall has been criticized by some fans for its unique design. Because the facility was designed without consideration for the video replay board added in 2005 that currently hangs above center-court, some of the top rows of the lower level are obstructed from the replay board by the overhanging balcony.  The entire court itself, however, is still viewable.  In December 2013, 24 monitors were added to the areas that had previously been obstructed.  Work was completed by Strauser Construction and Cassady Electric.

In the fall of 2018, J.C. Ripberger Construction Corp completed the new Roberts Family Team Center which includes, the new Andy Mohr Locker Room, the Oladipo Zeller Legacy Lounge, the Tim Garl Athletic Training Room and the Basketball Coaches annex. Project was completed just prior to 2018 Hoosier Hysteria.

Upgrades and improvements
Indiana installed a new playing surface during the summer of 1995. New bleacher seats were also added, along with a media row and end seating platforms on Lobby Level.

Upon his dismissal from Indiana, head coach Bob Knight predicted that with his departure advertisements would soon find their way into The Assembly Hall. Knight said, "You'll see a new Assembly Hall this year I'm sure. There will probably be ads in it for everything from dog biscuits to Pepsi Cola, I would imagine. We've always tried to keep it really free from commercialism. It's kind of a sacred place where students come to play and students come to cheer." In 2005 the school completed construction of a state-of-the-art, $1.9 million scoreboard-video board. As with Knight, some Hoosier purists criticized the new scoreboard and advertisements, which had never before been in The Assembly Hall.

In the spring of 2010 a new practice facility called Cook Hall was added adjacent to The Assembly Hall. The two facilities are connected to each other by a tunnel.

2015 renovation and renaming
On December 19, 2013, Indiana University announced that a $40 million donation from Cynthia "Cindy" Simon Skjodt, daughter of late shopping mall magnate and Indiana Pacers owner Mel Simon, would be used to renovate Assembly Hall. Indiana University renamed Assembly Hall the Simon Skjodt Assembly Hall upon the completion of the renovations and improvements, which were completed in October 2016.

The south lobby was restructured with a new entryway and dramatic atrium. Escalators replaced ramps in the south lobby. Throughout the arena, new branding and graphics were updated to celebrate the tradition and success of IU basketball.

Existing bathrooms and concession stands were remodeled and new bathrooms added. A large state-of-the-art video scoreboard replaced the current bifurcated scoreboard. Box seat-style seating was added above the south baseline bleachers and will generate revenue to pay for this seating and to help fund ongoing upkeep of Assembly Hall.

Behind the scenes, Assembly Hall's HVAC and other infrastructure systems were updated and a state-of-the-art broadcast technology center was added to enhance IU Athletics video production and game day broadcasts.

Safety issues
The scheduled game for that day against the University of Iowa was postponed due to safety concerns in spite of multiple available arenas in Indiana. 

On January 28, 2023, a bracket over a foot long fell onto the court at Assembly Hall during halftime against the Ohio State Buckeyes.

Atmosphere and success
The Assembly Hall is well known as being one of the loudest venues in college basketball, aided both by passionate fans and its unique design of steep sides. A 2012 poll of four ESPN pundits ranked it third in terms of best home-court advantages in the country. Since opening for the 1971–72 season, over six million fans have attended men's basketball games at the venue.  The men's team has been historically successful there, posting home winning streaks of 50 and 35 games. The Assembly Hall has been home to three national championships, 32 straight winning teams, and 14 conference champions.

During the 2015-2016 basketball season, both the men's and women's teams went undefeated at Assembly Hall, posting a combined 33–0 record at home.

Proposed replacement
On June 22, 2007, Indiana University trustees approved the demolition of the Assembly Hall and the construction of a new basketball arena "when appropriate".  Populous was hired to assess the benefits of renovating or replacing the Assembly Hall.  The trustees decided against renovating the stadium for $115 million because construction of a new arena would cost $130 million. This idea was scrapped due to the university changing course and opting to renovate Assembly Hall.

Events

2022 first and second-round games of the NCAA Women's Tournament

See also
Indiana–Kentucky rivalry
Indiana–Purdue rivalry
Illinois–Indiana men's basketball rivalry
Indiana Hoosiers
Indiana University Bloomington
List of NCAA Division I basketball arenas

References

External links

Assembly Hall – Indiana University Athletics

Indiana Hoosiers basketball venues
College basketball venues in the United States
Sports venues in Indiana
Buildings and structures completed in 1971
1971 establishments in Indiana